Amar Basu was an Indian  politician. He was elected as MLA of Jhargram Vidhan Sabha Constituency in West Bengal Legislative Assembly in 2006. He died on 20 February 2019 at the age of 79.

References

2019 deaths
Communist Party of India (Marxist) politicians
West Bengal MLAs 2006–2011
Year of birth missing